Uyar is the name of several inhabited localities in Krasnoyarsk Krai, Russia.

Urban localities
Uyar, Uyarsky District, Krasnoyarsk Krai, a town in Uyarsky District

Rural localities
Uyar, Krasnoturansky District, Krasnoyarsk Krai, a village in Bellyksky Selsoviet of Krasnoturansky District